The Camogie Association (formerly ) organises and promotes the sport of camogie in Ireland and around the world. The association has close ties with the Gaelic Athletic Association, but is still a separate organisation.

History
The Camogie Association was founded in 8 North Frederick St, Dublin on 25 February 1904, with Máire Ní Chinnéide as President. In 1911, it was reconstituted as Cualacht Luithchleas na mBan Gaedheal ("Gaelic Athletic Company of Women") at a meeting organised by Seaghán Ua Dúbhtaigh at 25 Rutland Square (now Parnell Square), Dublin. It was revived in 1923 and the first congress held on 25 April 1925, when over 100 delegates gathered in Conarchy's Hotel, Parnell Square. It was reconstituted again in 1939 as Cumann Camogaiochta na nGael. For a period in the 1930s it organised women's athletics events. A breakaway Cualacht Luithchleas na mBan Gaedheal continued in existence during 1939–51 as clubs in Cork, Dublin, Kildare, Meath and Wicklow disaffiliated in a series of disputes, largely over whether male officials should be allowed to hold office and whether players of ladies' hockey should be allowed to play camogie. The last of these disputes was not resolved until 1951. The decision to change the playing rules from 12-a-side to 15-a-side teams and to use the larger GAA-style field led to an increase of affiliations after 1999 from 400 clubs to 540 a decade later.

Constitution
A new constitution in 2010 shortened the name to An Cumann Camogaíochta and accepted the English title "Camogie Association" on official documents for the first time, reflecting the increased presence of the game in Europe, North America, Asia and Australasia.

Development plan
The game's National Development Plan 2010–2015, entitled Our Game, Our Passion, aims to increase the club base of the association from 540 clubs to 750 by 2015. Targets include: 
 36 new clubs to be established in existing hurling sections of GAA clubs by mid-2011;
 15 new clubs to be established in counties hosting féile na nGael by 2015;
 three new clubs to be established in each of Fermanagh, Leitrim and Sligo by 2014;
 14 new clubs to be established in Donegal, Mayo, Kerry and Monaghan by 2015;
 17 new clubs to be established in Cavan, Louth, Roscommon, Carlow and Laois by 2015;
 five new clubs to be established in each of 19 other counties by 2015;
 25 foundation-level courses and 4 level-one courses with aim of qualifying 400 coaches each year;
 numbers of players aged 14–19 to be increased by 20% by 2015;
 female attendance at cúl camps to be increased 10% year on year to 2012;
 county boards in Fermanagh, Leitrim, Longford and Sligo.

International development
An international games development strategy was commenced in 2010, with camogie established as part of the Continental Youth Games in the United States and a target of three teams from Great Britain participating in Féile na nGael by 2015.

Competitions
The Camogie Association organises All-Ireland Championships at Senior, Intermediate, "Premier Junior", Junior A, Junior B, Minor A, Minor B, and Minor C, and Under-16 A, B and C level. There is an All Ireland Club Championship at senior, intermediate and junior level, a National League an inter-provincial Gael Linn Cup at senior and junior level, inter-collegiate Ashbourne and Purcell cups and a programme of All-Ireland championships at secondary schools senior and junior levels.

President
The president of the association is elected by the sport's annual congress, in modern times for a three-year term, a year in advance.  Early presidents had longer terms.

Past presidents

 1905 Máire Ní Chinnéide (Dublin)
 1911 Elizabeth Burke-Plunkett (Dublin)
 1923 Máire Gill (Dublin)
 1941 Agnes O'Farrelly (Dublin)
 1942 Lil Kirby (Cork)
 1945 Agnes Hennessy (Cavan)
 1946 Síle Horgan (Cork)
 1949 Síghle Nic an Ultaigh (Down)
 1953 Lucy Cullen-Byrne (Mrs CM Byrne) (Wicklow)
 1956 Lily Spence (Antrim)
 1959 Eilish Redmond (Dublin)
 1962 Chris O'Connell (Limerick)
 1965 Lil O'Grady (Cork)
 1968 Rosina MacManus (Antrim)
 1971 Nell McCarthy (Dublin)
 1973 Nancy Murray (Antrim)
 1976 Úna Uí Phuirséil (Dublin)
 1979 Mary Moran (Cork)
 1982 Mary Fennelly (Kilkenny)
 1985 Mary Lynch (Monaghan)
 1988 Mary O'Callaghan (Cork)
 1991 Brídín Uí Mhaolagáin (Dublin)
 1994 Belle O'Loughlin (Down)
 1997 Phyllis Breslin (Dublin)
 2000 Pat Rafferty (Dublin)
 2003 Miriam O'Callaghan (Offaly)
 2006 Liz Howard (Tipperary)
 2009 Joan O'Flynn (Cork)
 2012 Aileen Lawlor (Westmeath)
 2015 Catherine Neary

Therese Condon from Ashbourne was president of the breakaway Cualacht Luithchleas na mBan Gaedheal Camóguidheacht Comhdháil in 1939–41. Maggie Dunne (Wexford) was president of the breakaway National Camogie Association in 1949.

References

External links
 Camogie.ie Official Camogie Association Website
 On The Ball Official Camogie Magazine Download pdf
 Camogie on official GAA website

Camogie
Gaelic games organisations
Gaelic games governing bodies in Ireland
All-island sports governing bodies in Ireland
Women's sports governing bodies in Ireland
Sports organizations established in 1905
1905 establishments in Ireland